Oleg Pankov (born 2 August 1967) is a Ukrainian former professional road cyclist. He finished 43rd in the road race at the 1996 Summer Olympics. He also won the Ukrainian National Road Race Championships in 1996.

Major results

1993
 3rd Overall Tour du Maroc
1996
 1st  Road race, National Road Championships
 1st Stage 8 Rheinland-Pfalz Rundfahrt
1997
 2nd Leeuwse Pijl
 10th Grote Prijs Jef Scherens
1998
 10th Brussels–Ingooigem
1999
 2nd Road race, National Road Championships
2000
 4th Rund um Düren
 8th Omloop van het Waasland
 10th Omloop van de Vlaamse Scheldeboorden
2001
 5th Grand Prix Pino Cerami

References

External links

1967 births
Ukrainian male cyclists
Living people
Cyclists at the 1996 Summer Olympics
Olympic cyclists of Ukraine
People from Melitopol
Sportspeople from Zaporizhzhia Oblast